The 2022 Alaska's at-large congressional district special election was held on August 16, 2022. Democrat Mary Peltola won the open seat, thereby becoming the first of her party to win a U.S. House election in Alaska since 1972. Peltola, who is a Yup'ik woman, is the first Alaska Native elected to Congress, and the first woman elected to represent Alaska in the House. She defeated Republican former governor Sarah Palin in the state's first ranked-choice general election.

The seat became vacant when 49-year incumbent Republican representative Don Young died on March 18, 2022. A special primary election was held on June 11, while the general election was held alongside the regular primary election on August 16. The filing deadline was on April 1. This was the first election to use the state's new voting system, approved for use with 2020 Alaska Measure 2. Under the new system, all candidates compete in a single blanket primary, with the four candidates receiving the most votes advancing to the general election, which is conducted using instant-runoff voting.

The special primary election took place in June 2022, and the top four vote-getters were set to advance to a general election. The third-placed candidate in the primary, Al Gross, withdrew, so only the other three names were on the ballot in the general election. This election used ranked-choice voting, with the winner being the one who accumulated a majority of the votes (or a majority of votes in play at that point in time).

The runoff count commenced on August 31, after all absentee and overseas ballots were counted. Peltola was declared the winner on August 31. The Democratic victory was widely considered an upset due to Alaska's strong Republican lean. Peltola became the first Democrat to win a statewide or congressional election in Alaska since Mark Begich in 2008. She was sworn in to the House of Representatives on September 13.

Nonpartisan blanket primary

Candidates

Advanced to general election 
 Sarah Palin (Republican), former governor of Alaska (2006–2009) and nominee for vice president of the United States in 2008
 Nick Begich III (Republican), Alaska Policy Forum board member, grandson of former U.S. Representative Nick Begich, nephew of former U.S. Senator Mark Begich and Alaska Senate Minority Leader Tom Begich
 Mary Peltola (Democratic), former state representative (1999–2009) and executive director of the Kuskokwim River Inter-Tribal Fish Commission

Withdrew after advancing to general election 
 Al Gross (Independent), orthopedic surgeon, commercial fisherman, son of former Alaska Attorney General Avrum Gross, and Democratic-endorsed nominee for U.S. Senate in 2020 (endorsed Peltola)

Eliminated in primary 
 Dennis Aguayo (Independent)
 Jay R. Armstrong (Republican), gold miner
 Brian Beal (Independent)
 Tim Beck (Independent), former Fairbanks North Star Borough Assembly member (1998–2004, 2005–2011), candidate for FNSB mayor (2000) and Alaska Senate (2006)
 Gregg Brelsford (Independent), lawyer and former Bristol Bay Borough manager (2018–2020)
 Robert Brown (Independent), veteran
 Chris Bye (Libertarian), fishing guide
 John Callahan (Republican), public affairs officer for the Alaska Air National Guard
 Arlene Carl (Independent), retiree
 Santa Claus (Independent), North Pole city councillor (2015–2018, since 2019) and current mayor pro tem (endorsed Peltola)
 John Coghill (Republican), former majority leader of the Alaskan State Senate (2013–2017), former state senator (2009–2021), former majority leader of the Alaskan House of Representatives (2002–2006), former state representative (1999–2009), son of former Lieutenant Governor Jack Coghill, and U.S. Air Force veteran
 Christopher Constant (Democratic), Anchorage Assembly member since 2017
 Lady Donna Dutchess (Independent), judicial reform activist
 Otto Florschutz (Republican), former Wrangell Port Commissioner
 Laurel Foster (Independent), paralegal
 Tom Gibbons (Republican), business manager
 Karyn Griffin (Independent), political organizer and activist
 Andrew Halcro (Independent), former Republican state representative (1998–2003) and Independent candidate for governor of Alaska in 2006
 Ted Heintz (Independent), Corporate Contract Services Professional
 William Hibler III (Independent), former glaciologist with the University of Alaska Fairbanks and Democratic candidate for Alaska's at-large congressional district in 2016 and 2020
 John Howe (Alaskan Independence Party), machinist and Alaskan Independence Party nominee for U.S. Senate in 2020
 David Hughes (Independent), program manager
 Don Knight (Independent)
 Jeff Lowenfels (Independent), attorney and gardening writer
 Robert "Bob" Lyons (Republican), case manager
 Anne McCabe (Independent), former president of the Kenai Peninsula Educational Support Association
 Mikel Melander, blue collar worker
 Sherry Mettler (Independent), businesswoman
 Mike Milligan (Democratic), former Kodiak Island Borough Assembly member, Green Party nominee for U.S. House (1992) and lieutenant governor (1998)
 J. R. Myers (Libertarian), behavioral health clinician, founder of the Alaska Constitution Party and its nominee for governor in 2014
 Emil Notti (Democratic), engineer, former commissioner of the Alaska Department of Commerce, former chair of the Alaska Democratic Party, and nominee for Alaska's at-large congressional district in 1973
 Robert Ornelas (American Independent Party), perennial candidate
 Silvio Pellegrini (Independent), cyber security manager, IT project manager, and intelligence analyst for the US Air Force Reserve
 Josh Revak (Republican), state senator for District M (2019–present) and U.S. Army veteran
 Maxwell Sumner (Republican), homebuilder
 Tara Sweeney (Republican), former assistant secretary of the Interior for the Bureau of Indian Affairs (2018–2021) (ran as write-in candidate in general election)
 David Thistle (Independent)
 Ernest Thomas (Democratic)
 Clayton Trotter (Republican), college professor
 Bradley Welter (Republican)
 Jason Williams (Independent)
 Joe Woodward (Republican)
 Adam Wool (Democratic), state representative (2015–present)
 Stephen Wright (Republican), candidate for Alaska's at-large congressional district in 2016, candidate for Alaska State Senate in 2020, and U.S. Air Force veteran

Withdrawn 
 Breck Craig (Independent), candidate for U.S. Senate in 2016
 Richard Morris (Independent)
 Jesse Sumner (Republican), member of the Matanuska-Susitna Borough Assembly

Declined 
 Les Gara (Democratic), former state representative (2003–2019) (running for governor)
 Mead Treadwell (Republican), former lieutenant governor of Alaska (endorsed Sweeney)

Endorsements

Debates and forums

Polling

Results

General election 
Under Alaska's top-four primary system, if a general election candidate drops out, the director of elections may replace them with the name of the fifth-place finisher. Shortly after the primary, Al Gross dropped out of the general election, but Division of Elections Director Gail Fenumiai did not advance Tara Sweeney in his place because there was less than 64 days remaining until the general election as required by law. After a lawsuit, the Alaska Supreme Court upheld Fenumiai's decision.

Predictions

Endorsements

Polling 

Al Gross vs. Sarah Palin vs. Lora Reinbold vs. Josh Revak

Al Gross vs. Sarah Palin

Al Gross vs. Josh Revak

Results

See also

 2022 United States House of Representatives elections
 2022 United States elections
 117th United States Congress
 List of special elections to the United States House of Representatives

Notes

Partisan clients

References

United States House of Representatives 01 special
Alaska 01 special
United States House of Representatives 2022 01
August 2022 events in the United States
Alaska 2022 01
2022 01 special
Alaska 2022 01
Sarah Palin